Stephen Shellans Jr. (born July 13, 1960) is an American rower. He competed in the men's coxed pair event at the 1992 Summer Olympics.

References

External links
 

1960 births
Living people
American male rowers
Olympic rowers of the United States
Rowers at the 1992 Summer Olympics
Sportspeople from Summit, New Jersey
Pan American Games medalists in rowing
Pan American Games gold medalists for the United States
Pan American Games silver medalists for the United States
Rowers at the 1983 Pan American Games
Rowers at the 1987 Pan American Games